The 1932–33 Hong Kong First Division League season was the 25th since its establishment.

League table

References
1932–33 Hong Kong First Division table (RSSSF)
香港倒後鏡blog

Hong Kong First Division League seasons
1932–33 in Asian association football leagues
3